Inflata is a genus of 'flashing' firefly (family Lampyridae) found in Thailand, containing a single recognized species, Inflata indica.

References

Lampyridae
Lampyridae genera
Monotypic beetle genera
Bioluminescent insects
Beetles described in 1854